Michael Beesley (born 10 June 1942) is an English former professional footballer who played as an inside forward. Beesley's professional career, which lasted from 1960 to 1971, saw him play for three different teams in the Football League, making a total of nearly 250 appearances.

Career
Born in Epping Forest, Beesley began his career with the youth team of West Ham United, playing in the 1958–59 FA Youth Cup. Beesley played in the Football League for West Ham United, Southend United and Peterborough United between 1960 and 1971, scoring 40 goals in 239 games. Beesley later played non-league football with Dover.

References

External links

1942 births
Living people
English footballers
West Ham United F.C. players
Southend United F.C. players
Peterborough United F.C. players
English Football League players
Dover F.C. players
Association football forwards